Albemarle County Courthouse Historic District is a historic courthouse and national historic district located at Charlottesville, Virginia. The district encompasses 22 contributing buildings and 1 contributing object (the Thomas Jonathan Jackson sculpture) centered on Court Square.  The original section of the courthouse was built in 1803 in the Federal style and is now the north wing.  The courthouse is a two-story, five-bay, "T" shaped brick building with a Greek Revival style portico.  Other notable buildings include the Levy Opera House (c. 1851), Number Nothing (c. 1820), Redland Club (c. 1832), and Eagle Tavern.

It was listed on the National Register of Historic Places in 1973. The district was incorporated into the Charlottesville and Albemarle County Courthouse Historic District in 1982.

References

External links

Albemarle County Courthouse, Court Square, Charlottesville, Charlottesville, VA: 6 measured drawings and 15 data pages at Historic American Buildings Survey

Historic American Buildings Survey in Virginia
County courthouses in Virginia
Courthouses on the National Register of Historic Places in Virginia
Historic districts on the National Register of Historic Places in Virginia
Government buildings completed in 1803
Buildings and structures in Charlottesville, Virginia
National Register of Historic Places in Charlottesville, Virginia